Wonder Why can refer to:
 Wonder Why (song), 1951 song by Sammy Cahn and Nicholas Brodszky
 Wonder Why?, Canadian educational TV program, 1990-1994